Bacterial taxonomy is subfield of taxonomy devoted to the classification of bacteria specimens into taxonomic ranks.

In the scientific classification established by Carl Linnaeus, each species is assigned to a genus resulting in a two-part name. This name denotes the two lowest levels in a hierarchy of ranks, increasingly larger groupings of species based on common traits. Of these ranks, domains are the most general level of categorization. Presently, scientists classify all life into just three domains, Eukaryotes, Bacteria and Archaea.  

Bacterial taxonomy is the classification of strains within the domain Bacteria into hierarchies of similarity. This classification is similar to that of plants, mammals, and other taxonomies. However, biologists specializing in different areas have developed differing taxonomic conventions over time. For example, bacterial taxonomists name types based on descriptions of strains. Zoologists among others use a type specimen instead.

Diversity

Bacteria (prokaryotes, together with Archaea) share many common features. These commonalities include the lack a of nuclear membrane, unicellularity,  division by binary-fission and generally small size. The various species can be differentiated through the comparison of on several characteristics, allowing their identification and classification. Examples include:
 Phylogeny: All bacteria stem from a common ancestor and diversified since, and consequently possess different levels of evolutionary relatedness (see Bacterial phyla and Timeline of evolution)
 Metabolism: Different bacteria may have different metabolic abilities (see Microbial metabolism)
 Environment: Different bacteria thrive in different environments, such as high/low temperature and salt (see Extremophiles)
 Morphology: There are many structural differences between bacteria, such as cell shape, Gram stain (number of lipid bilayers) or bilayer composition (see Bacterial cellular morphologies, Bacterial cell structure)

History

First descriptions
Bacteria were first observed by Antonie van Leeuwenhoek in 1676, using a single-lens microscope of his own design. He called them "animalcules" and published his observations in a series of letters to the Royal Society.

Early described genera of bacteria include Vibrio and Monas, by O. F. Müller (1773, 1786), then classified as Infusoria (however, many species before included in those genera are regarded today as protists); Polyangium, by H. F. Link (1809), the first bacterium still recognized today; Serratia, by Bizio (1823); and Spirillum, Spirochaeta and Bacterium, by Ehrenberg (1838).

The term Bacterium, introduced as a genus by Ehrenberg in 1838, became a catch-all for rod-shaped cells.

Early formal classifications

Bacteria were first classified as plants constituting the class Schizomycetes, which along with the Schizophyceae (blue green algae/Cyanobacteria) formed the phylum Schizophyta.

Haeckel in 1866 placed the group in the phylum Moneres (from μονήρης: simple) in the kingdom Protista and defines them as completely structureless and homogeneous organisms, consisting only of a piece of plasma. He subdivided the phylum into two groups:
  (no envelope)
 Protogenes – such as Protogenes primordialis, now classed as a eukaryote and not a bacterium
 Protamaeba – now classed as a eukaryote and not a bacterium
 Vibrio – a genus of comma shaped bacteria first described in 1854)
 Bacterium – a genus of rod shaped bacteria first described in 1828, that later gave its name to the members of the Monera, formerly referred to as "a moneron" (plural "monera") in English and ""(fem. pl. "") in German
 Bacillus – a genus of spore-forming rod shaped bacteria first described in 1835
 Spirochaeta – thin spiral shaped bacteria first described in 1835
 Spirillum – spiral shaped bacteria first described in 1832
 etc.
  (with envelope)
 Protomonas – now classed as a eukaryote and not a bacterium. The name was reused in 1984 for an unrelated genus of Bacteria
 Vampyrella – now classed as a eukaryote and not a bacterium

The classification of Ferdinand Cohn (1872) was influential in the nineteenth century, and recognized six genera: Micrococcus, Bacterium, Bacillus, Vibrio, Spirillum, and Spirochaeta.

The group was later reclassified as the Prokaryotes by Chatton.

The classification of Cyanobacteria (colloquially "blue green algae") has been fought between being algae or bacteria (for example, Haeckel classified Nostoc in the phylum Archephyta of Algae).

in 1905, Erwin F. Smith accepted 33 valid different names of bacterial genera and over 150 invalid names, and Vuillemin, in a 1913 study, concluded that all species of the Bacteria should fall into the genera Planococcus, Streptococcus, Klebsiella, Merista, Planomerista, Neisseria, Sarcina, Planosarcina, Metabacterium, Clostridium, Serratia, Bacterium, and Spirillum.

Cohn recognized four tribes: Spherobacteria, Microbacteria, Desmobacteria, and Spirobacteria. Stanier and van Neil recognized the kingdom Monera with two phyla, Myxophyta and Schizomycetae, the latter comprising classes Eubacteriae (three orders), Myxobacteriae (one order), and Spirochetae (one order). Bisset distinguished 1 class and 4 orders: Eubacteriales, Actinomycetales, Streptomycetales, and Flexibacteriales. Walter Migula's system, which was the most widely accepted system of its time and included all then-known species but was based only on morphology, contained the three basic groups Coccaceae, Bacillaceae, and Spirillaceae, but also Trichobacterinae for filamentous bacteria.  Orla-Jensen established two orders: Cephalotrichinae (seven families) and Peritrichinae (presumably with only one family). Bergey et al. presented a classification which generally followed the 1920 Final Report of the Society of American Bacteriologists Committee (Winslow et al.), which divided class Schizomycetes into four orders: Myxobacteriales, Thiobacteriales, Chlamydobacteriales, and Eubacteriales, with a fifth group being four genera considered intermediate between bacteria and protozoans: Spirocheta, Cristospira, Saprospira, and Treponema.

However, different authors often reclassified the genera due to the lack of visible traits to go by, resulting in a poor state which was summarised in 1915 by Robert Earle Buchanan. By then, the whole group received different ranks and names by different authors, namely:
 Schizomycetes (Naegeli 1857)
 Bacteriaceae (Cohn 1872 a)
 Bacteria (Cohn 1872 b)
 Schizomycetaceae (DeToni and Trevisan 1889)
Furthermore, the families into which the class was subdivided changed from author to author and for some, such as Zipf, the names were in German and not in Latin.

The first edition of the Bacteriological Code in 1947 sorted out several problems. 

A. R. Prévot's system) had four subphyla and eight classes, as follows:
Eubacteriales (classes Asporulales and Sporulales)
Mycobacteriales (classes Actinomycetales, Myxobacteriales, and Azotobacteriales)
Algobacteriales (classes Siderobacteriales and Thiobacteriales)
Protozoobacteriales (class Spirochetales)

Informal groups based on Gram staining
Despite there being little agreement on the major subgroups of the Bacteria, Gram staining results were most commonly used as a classification tool. Consequently, until the advent of molecular phylogeny, the Kingdom Prokaryota was divided into four divisions, A classification scheme still formally followed by Bergey's manual of systematic bacteriology for tome order
 Gracilicutes (gram-negative)
 Photobacteria (photosynthetic): class Oxyphotobacteriae (water as electron donor, includes the order Cyanobacteriales=blue-green algae, now phylum Cyanobacteria) and class Anoxyphotobacteriae (anaerobic phototrophs, orders: Rhodospirillales and Chlorobiales
 Scotobacteria (non-photosynthetic, now the Proteobacteria and other gram-negative nonphotosynthetic phyla)
 Firmacutes [sic] (gram-positive, subsequently corrected to Firmicutes)
several orders such as Bacillales and Actinomycetales (now in the phylum Actinobacteria)
 Mollicutes (gram variable, e.g. Mycoplasma)
 Mendocutes (uneven gram stain, "methanogenic bacteria", now known as the Archaea)

Molecular era

"Archaic bacteria" and Woese's reclassification

Woese argued that the bacteria, archaea, and eukaryotes represent separate lines of descent that diverged early on from an ancestral colony of organisms. However, a few biologists argue that the Archaea and Eukaryota arose from a group of bacteria. In any case, it is thought that viruses and archaea began relationships approximately two billion years ago, and that co-evolution may have been occurring between members of these groups. It is possible that the last common ancestor of the bacteria and archaea was a thermophile, which raises the possibility that lower temperatures are "extreme environments" in archaeal terms, and organisms that live in cooler environments appeared only later. Since the Archaea and Bacteria are no more related to each other than they are to eukaryotes, the term prokaryote only surviving meaning is "not a eukaryote", limiting its value.

With improved methodologies it became clear that the methanogenic bacteria were profoundly different and were (erroneously) believed to be relics of ancient bacteria thus Carl Woese, regarded as the forerunner of the molecular phylogeny revolution, identified three primary lines of descent: the Archaebacteria, the Eubacteria, and the Urkaryotes, the latter now represented by the nucleocytoplasmic component of the Eukaryotes. These lineages were formalised into the rank Domain (regio in Latin) which divided Life into 3 domains: the Eukaryota, the Archaea and the Bacteria.

Subdivisions

In 1987 Carl Woese divided the Eubacteria into 11 divisions based on 16S ribosomal RNA (SSU) sequences, which with several additions are still used today.

Opposition
While the three domain system is widely accepted, some authors have opposed it for various reasons.

One prominent scientist who opposes the three domain system is Thomas Cavalier-Smith, who proposed that the Archaea and the Eukaryotes (the Neomura) stem from Gram positive bacteria (Posibacteria), which in turn derive from gram negative bacteria (Negibacteria) based on several logical arguments, which are highly controversial and generally disregarded by the molecular biology community (c.f. reviewers' comments on, e.g. Eric Bapteste is "agnostic" regarding the conclusions) and are often not mentioned in reviews (e.g.) due to the subjective nature of the assumptions made.

However, despite there being a wealth of statistically supported studies towards the rooting of the tree of life between the Bacteria and the Neomura by means of a variety of methods, including some that are impervious to accelerated evolution—which is claimed by Cavalier-Smith to be the source of the supposed fallacy in molecular methods—there are a few studies which have drawn different conclusions, some of which place the root in the phylum Firmicutes with nested archaea.

Radhey Gupta's molecular taxonomy, based on conserved signature sequences of proteins, includes a monophyletic Gram negative clade, a monophyletic Gram positive clade, and a polyphyletic Archeota derived from Gram positives. Hori and Osawa's molecular analysis indicated a link between Metabacteria (=Archeota) and eukaryotes. The only cladistic analyses for bacteria based on classical evidence largely corroborate Gupta's results (see comprehensive mega-taxonomy).

James Lake presented a 2 primary kingdom arrangement (Parkaryotae + eukaryotes and eocytes + Karyotae) and suggested a 5 primary kingdom scheme (Eukaryota, Eocyta, Methanobacteria, Halobacteria, and Eubacteria) based on ribosomal structure and a 4 primary kingdom scheme (Eukaryota, Eocyta, Methanobacteria, and Photocyta), bacteria being classified according to 3 major biochemical innovations: photosynthesis (Photocyta), methanogenesis (Methanobacteria), and sulfur respiration (Eocyta). He has also discovered evidence that Gram-negative bacteria arose from a symbiosis between 2 Gram-positive bacteria.

Authorities

Classification is the grouping of organisms into progressively more inclusive groups based on phylogeny and phenotype, while nomenclature is the application of formal rules for naming organisms.

Nomenclature authority

Despite there being no official and complete classification of prokaryotes, the names (nomenclature) given to prokaryotes are regulated by the International Code of Nomenclature of Bacteria (Bacteriological Code), a book which contains general considerations, principles, rules, and various notes, and advises in a similar fashion to the nomenclature codes of other groups.

Classification authorities
As taxa proliferated, computer aided taxonomic systems were developed. Early non networked identification software entering widespread use was produced by Edwards 1978, Kellogg 1979, Schindler, Duben, and Lysenko 1979, Beers and Lockhard 1962, Gyllenberg 1965, Holmes and Hill 1985, Lapage et al 1970 and Lapage et al 1973.

Today the taxa which have been correctly described are reviewed in Bergey's manual of Systematic Bacteriology, which aims to aid in the identification of species and is considered the highest authority. An online version of the taxonomic outline of bacteria and archaea (TOBA) is available .

List of Prokaryotic names with Standing in Nomenclature (LPSN) is an online database which currently contains over two thousand accepted names with their references, etymologies and various notes.

Description of new species

The International Journal of Systematic Bacteriology/International Journal of Systematic and Evolutionary Microbiology (IJSB/IJSEM) is a peer reviewed journal which acts as the official international forum for the publication of new prokaryotic taxa. If a species is published in a different peer review journal, the author can submit a request to IJSEM with the appropriate description, which if correct, the new species will be featured in the Validation List of IJSEM.

Distribution

Microbial culture collections are depositories of strains which aim to safeguard them and to distribute them. The main ones being:

Analyses

Bacteria were at first classified based solely on their shape (vibrio, bacillus, coccus etc.), presence of endospores, gram stain, aerobic conditions and motility. This system changed with the study of metabolic phenotypes, where metabolic characteristics were used. Recently, with the advent of molecular phylogeny, several genes are used to identify species, the most important of which is the 16S rRNA gene, followed by 23S, ITS region, gyrB and others to confirm a better resolution. The quickest way to identify to match an isolated strain to a species or genus today is done by amplifying its 16S gene with universal primers and sequence the 1.4kb amplicon and submit it to a specialised web-based identification database, namely either Ribosomal Database Project, which align the sequence to other 16S sequences using infernal, a secondary structure bases global alignment, or ARB SILVA, which aligns sequences via SINA (SILVA incremental aligner), which does a local alignment of a seed and extends it .

Several identification methods exists:
 Phenotypic analyses
 fatty acid analyses
 Growth conditions (Agar plate, Biolog multiwell plates)
 Genetic analyses
 DNA-DNA hybridization
 DNA profiling
 Sequence
 GC ratios
 Phylogenetic analyses
 16S-based phylogeny
 phylogeny based on other genes
 Multi-gene sequence analysis
 Whole-genome sequence based analysis

New species
The minimal standards for describing a new species depend on which group the species belongs to. c.f.

Candidatus

Candidatus is a component of the taxonomic name for a bacterium that cannot be maintained in a Bacteriology Culture Collection. It is an interim taxonomic status for noncultivable organisms. e.g. "Candidatus Pelagibacter ubique"

Species concept

Bacteria divide asexually and for the most part do not show regionalisms ("Everything is everywhere"), therefore the concept of species, which works best for animals, becomes entirely a matter of judgment.

The number of named species of bacteria and archaea (approximately 13,000) is surprisingly small considering their early evolution, genetic diversity and residence in all ecosystems. The reason for this is the differences in species concepts between the bacteria and macro-organisms, the difficulties in growing/characterising in pure culture (a prerequisite to naming new species, vide supra) and extensive horizontal gene transfer blurring the distinction of species.

The most commonly accepted definition is the polyphasic species definition, which takes into account both phenotypic and genetic differences.
However, a quicker diagnostic ad hoc threshold to separate species is less than 70% DNA–DNA hybridisation, which corresponds to less than 97% 16S DNA sequence identity. It has been noted that if this were applied to animal classification, the order primates would be a single species.
For this reason, more stringent species definitions based on whole genome sequences have been proposed.

Pathology vs. phylogeny
Ideally, taxonomic classification should reflect the evolutionary history of the taxa, i.e. the phylogeny. Although some exceptions are present when the phenotype differs amongst the group, especially from a medical standpoint. Some examples of problematic classifications follow.

Escherichia coli: overly large and polyphyletic

In the family Enterobacteriaceae of the class Gammaproteobacteria, the species in the genus Shigella (S. dysenteriae, S. flexneri, S. boydii, S. sonnei) from an evolutionary point of view are strains of the species Escherichia coli (polyphyletic), but due to genetic differences cause different medical conditions in the case of the pathogenic strains. Confusingly, there are also E. coli strains that produce Shiga toxin known as STEC.

Escherichia coli is a badly classified species as some strains share only 20% of their genome. Being so diverse it should be given a higher taxonomic ranking. However, due to the medical conditions associated with the species, it will not be changed to avoid confusion in medical context.

Bacillus cereus group: close and polyphyletic

In a similar way, the Bacillus species (=phylum Firmicutes) belonging to the "B. cereus group" (B. anthracis, B. cereus, B . thuringiensis, B. mycoides, B. pseudomycoides, B. weihenstephanensis and B. medusa) have 99-100% similar 16S rRNA sequence (97% is a commonly cited adequate species cut-off) and are polyphyletic, but for medical reasons (anthrax etc.) remain separate.

Yersinia pestis: extremely recent species

Yersinia pestis is in effect a strain of Yersinia pseudotuberculosis, but with a pathogenicity island that confers a drastically different pathology (Black plague and tuberculosis-like symptoms respectively) which arose 15,000 to 20,000 years ago.

Nested genera in Pseudomonas

In the gammaproteobacterial order Pseudomonadales, the genus Azotobacter and the species Azomonas macrocytogenes are actually members of the genus Pseudomonas, but were misclassified due to nitrogen fixing capabilities and the large size of the genus Pseudomonas which renders classification problematic. This will probably rectified in the close future.

Nested genera in Bacillus

Another example of a large genus with nested genera is the genus Bacillus, in which the genera Paenibacillus and Brevibacillus are nested clades. There is insufficient genomic data at present to fully and effectively correct taxonomic errors in Bacillus.

Agrobacterium: resistance to name change

Based on molecular data it was shown that the genus Agrobacterium is nested in Rhizobium and the Agrobacterium species transferred to the genus Rhizobium (resulting in the following comp. nov.: Rhizobium radiobacter (formerly known as A. tumefaciens), R. rhizogenes, R. rubi, R. undicola and R. vitis) Given the plant pathogenic nature of Agrobacterium species, it was proposed to maintain the genus Agrobacterium and the latter was counter-argued

Nomenclature

Taxonomic names are written in italics (or underlined when handwritten) with a majuscule first letter with the exception of epithets for species and subspecies. Despite it being common in zoology, tautonyms (e.g. Bison bison) are not acceptable and names of taxa used in zoology, botany or mycology cannot be reused for Bacteria (Botany and Zoology do share names).

Nomenclature is the set of rules and conventions which govern the names of taxa. The difference in nomenclature between the various kingdoms/domains is reviewed in.

For Bacteria, valid names must have a Latin or Neolatin name and can only use basic latin letters (w and j inclusive, see History of the Latin alphabet for these), consequently hyphens, accents and other letters are not accepted and should be transliterated correctly (e.g. ß=ss). Ancient Greek being written in the Greek alphabet, needs to be transliterated into the Latin alphabet.

When compound words are created, a connecting vowel is needed depending on the origin of the preceding word, regardless of the word that follows, unless the latter starts with a vowel in which case no connecting vowel is added. If the first compound is Latin then the connecting vowel is an -i-, whereas if the first compound is Greek, the connecting vowel is an -o-.

For etymologies of names consult LPSN.

Rules for higher taxa

For the Prokaryotes (Bacteria and Archaea) the rank kingdom is not used (although some authors refer to phyla as kingdoms)

If a new or amended species is placed in new ranks, according to Rule 9 of the Bacteriological Code the name is formed by the addition of an appropriate suffix to the stem of the name of the type genus. For subclass and class the recommendation from is generally followed, resulting in a neutral plural, however a few names do not follow this and instead keep into account graeco-latin grammar (e.g. the female plurals Thermotogae, Aquificae and Chlamydiae, the male plurals Chloroflexi, Bacilli and Deinococci and the greek plurals Spirochaetes, Gemmatimonadetes and Chrysiogenetes).

Phyla endings

Until 2021, phyla were not covered by the Bacteriological code, so they were named informally. This resulted in a variety of approaches to naming phyla. Some phyla, like Firmicutes, were named according to features shared across the phylum. Others, like Chlamydiae, were named using a class name or genus name as the stem (e.g., Chlamydia). In 2021, the decision was made to include names under the Bacteriological Code. Consequently, many phylum names were updated according to the new nomenclatural rules. The higher taxa proposed by Cavalier-Smith are generally disregarded by the molecular phylogeny community (e.g.) (vide supra). 

Under the new rules, the name of a phylum is derived from the type genus:

 Acidobacteriota (from Acidobacterium)
 Actinomycetota (from Actinomyces)
 Aquificota (from Aquifex)
 Armatimonadota (from Armatimonas)
 Atribacterota (from Atribacter)
 Bacillota (from Bacillus)
 Bacteroidota (from Bacteroides)
 Balneolota (from Balneola)
 Bdellovibrionota (from Bdellovibrio)
 Caldisericota (from Caldisericum)
 Calditrichota (from Caldithrix)
 Campylobacterota (from Campylobacter)
 Chlamydiota (from Chlamydia)
 Chlorobiota (from Chlorobium)
 Chloroflexota (from Chloroflexus)
 Chrysiogenota (from Chrysiogenes)
 Coprothermobacterota (from Coprothermobacter)
 Deferribacterota (from Deferribacter)
 Deinococcota (from Deinococcus)
 Dictyoglomota (from Dictyoglomus)
 Elusimicrobiota (from Elusimicrobium)
 Fibrobacterota (from Fibrobacterota)
 Fusobacteriota (from Fusobacterium)
 Gemmatimonadota (from Gemmatimonas)
 Ignavibacteriota (from Ignavibacterium)
 Kiritimatiellota (from Kiritimatiella)
 Lentisphaerota (from Lentisphaera)
 Mycoplasmatota (from Mycoplasma)
 Myxococcota (from Myxococcus)
 Nitrospinota (from Nitrospina)
 Nitrospirota (from Nitrospira)
 Planctomycetota (from Planctomyces)
 Pseudomonadota (from Pseudomonas)
 Rhodothermota (from Rhodothermus)
 Spirochaetota (from Spirochaeta)
 Synergistota (from Synergistes)
 Thermodesulfobacteriota (from Thermodesulfobacterium)
 Thermomicrobiota (from Thermomicrobium)
 Thermotogota (from Thermotoga)
 Verrucomicrobiota (from Verrucomicrobium)

Names after people

Several species are named after people, either the discoverer or a famous person in the field of microbiology, for example Salmonella is after D.E. Salmon, who discovered it (albeit as "Bacillus typhi").

For the generic epithet, all names derived from people must be in the female nominative case, either by changing the ending to -a or to the diminutive -ella, depending on the name.

For the specific epithet, the names can be converted into either adjectival form (adding -nus (m.), -na (f.), -num (n.) according to the gender of the genus name) or the genitive of the Latinised name.

Names after places

Many species (the specific epithet) are named after the place they are present or found (e.g. Thiospirillum jenense). Their names are created by forming an adjective by joining the locality's name with the ending -ensis (m. or f.) or ense (n.) in agreement with the gender of the genus name, unless a classical Latin adjective exists for the place. However, names of places should not be used as nouns in the genitive case.

Vernacular names

Despite the fact that some hetero/homogeneus colonies or biofilms of bacteria have names in English (e.g. dental plaque or Star jelly), no bacterial species has a vernacular/trivial/common name in English.

For names in the singular form, plurals cannot be made (singulare tantum) as would imply multiple groups with the same label and not multiple members of that group (by analogy, in English, chairs and tables are types of furniture, which cannot be used in the plural form "furnitures" to describe both members), conversely names plural form are pluralia tantum. However, a partial exception to this is made by the use of vernacular names.
However, to avoid repetition of taxonomic names which break the flow of prose, vernacular names of members of a genus or higher taxa are often used and recommended, these are formed by writing the name of the taxa in sentence case roman ("standard" in MS Office) type, therefore treating the proper noun as an English common noun (e.g. the salmonellas), although there is some debate about the grammar of plurals, which can either be regular plural by adding -(e)s (the salmonellas) or using the ancient Greek or Latin plural form (irregular plurals) of the noun (the salmonellae); the latter is problematic as the plural of - bacter would be -bacteres, while the plural of myces (N.L. masc. n. from Gr. masc. n. mukes) is mycetes.

Customs are present for certain names, such as those ending in -monas are converted into -monad (one pseudomonad, two aeromonads and not -monades).

Bacteria which are the etiological cause for a disease are often referred to by the disease name followed by a describing noun (bacterium, bacillus, coccus, agent or the name of their phylum) e.g. cholera bacterium (Vibrio cholerae) or Lyme disease spirochete (Borrelia burgdorferi), note also rickettsialpox (Rickettsia akari) (for more see).

Treponema is converted into treponeme and the plural is treponemes and not treponemata.

Some unusual bacteria have special names such as Quin's oval (Quinella ovalis) and Walsby's square (Haloquadratum walsbyi).

Before the advent of molecular phylogeny, many higher taxonomic groupings had only trivial names, which are still used today, some of which are polyphyletic, such as Rhizobacteria. Some higher taxonomic trivial names are:
 Blue-green algae are members of the phylum "Cyanobacteria"
 Green non-sulfur bacteria are members of the phylum Chloroflexota
 Green sulfur bacteria are members of the Chlorobiota
 Purple bacteria are some, but not all, members of the phylum Pseudomonadota
 Purple sulfur bacteria are members of the order Chromatiales
 low G+C Gram-positive bacteria are members of the phylum Bacillota, regardless of GC content
 high G+C Gram-positive bacteria are members of the phylum Actinomycetota, regardless of GC content
 Rhizobia are members of various genera of Pseudomonadota
 Lactic acid bacteria are members of the order Lactobacillales
 Coryneform bacteria are members of the family Corynebacteriaceae
 Fruiting gliding bacteria or myxobacteria are members of the phylum Myxococcota
 Enterics are members of the order Enterobacteriales (although the term is avoided if they do not live in the intestines, such as Pectobacterium)
 Acetic acid bacteria are members of the family Acetobacteraceae

Terminology
 The abbreviation for species is sp. (plural spp.) and is used after a generic epithet to indicate a species of that genus. Often used to denote a strain of a genus for which the species is not known either because has the organism has not been described yet as a species or insufficient tests were conducted to identify it. For example Halomonas sp. GFAJ-1
 If a bacterium is known and well-studied but not culturable, it is given the term Candidatus in its name
 A basonym is original name of a new combination, namely the first name given to a taxon before it was reclassified
 A synonym is an alternative name for a taxon, i.e. a taxon was erroneously described twice
 When a taxon is transferred it becomes a new combination (comb. nov.) or new name (nom. nov.)
 paraphyly, monophyly, and polyphyly

See also
 Branching order of bacterial phyla (Woese, 1987)
 Branching order of bacterial phyla (Gupta, 2001)
 Branching order of bacterial phyla (Cavalier-Smith, 2002)
 Branching order of bacterial phyla (Rappe and Giovanoni, 2003)
 Branching order of bacterial phyla (Battistuzzi et al.,2004)
 Branching order of bacterial phyla (Ciccarelli et al., 2006)
 Branching order of bacterial phyla after ARB Silva Living Tree
 Branching order of bacterial phyla (Genome Taxonomy Database, 2018)
 Bacterial phyla, a complicated classification
 List of Archaea genera
 List of Bacteria genera
 List of bacterial orders
 List of Latin and Greek words commonly used in systematic names
 List of sequenced archaeal genomes
 List of sequenced prokaryotic genomes
 List of clinically important bacteria
 Species problem
 Evolutionary grade
 Cryptic species complex
 Synonym (taxonomy)
 Taxonomy
 LPSN, list of accepted bacterial and archaeal names
 Cyanobacteria, a phylum of common bacteria but poorly classified at present
 Human microbiome project
 Microbial ecology

References

 
Biological nomenclature